This article is about music-related events in 1832.

Events
Spring – Elias Parish Alvars gives concerts in Constantinople before Sultan Mahmud II.
February 26 – Chopin gave his debut Paris concert at the Salle Pleyel. 
April 20 – Franz Liszt attends a charity concert for the Parisian cholera epidemic given by Niccolò Paganini. He vows to become the 'Paganini of the Piano'.
May 14 – Première of Felix Mendelssohn's overture The Hebrides is held in London.
September – Paris's Opéra-Comique moves from Salle Ventadour to Salle de la Bourse.
November 22 – Baritone Manuel García marries operatic soprano Cécile Eugénie Mayer.
Changes to American Army regulations make bandsmen regular soldiers, required to serve in battle if needed, establishes a position for bandmasters, and limits the size of regimental bands.
First Publication of "America (My Country, 'Tis of Thee)"

Classical Music
Charles-Valentin Alkan – Concerti da Camera nos. 1 and 2, Op. 10
William Sterndale Bennett – Piano Concerto No.1, Op.1
Hector Berlioz – Lelio, Cantata, premiered December 9 in Paris
Frederic Chopin 
5 Mazurkas Op. 7
Mazurka in B-flat major 'Wołowska', B.73
Johann Baptist Cramer –  Piano Quintet No.3
Adolf Friedrich Hesse – Fantasie für die Orgel zu 4 Händen, Op.35
Friedrich Kuhlau 
La clochette, Op. 121
Allegro pathetique for Piano 4-hands, Op. 123
Adagio and Rondo for Piano 4-Hands, Op. 124
Albert Lortzing – Singspiel Szenen aus Mozarts Leben
Felix Mendelssohn – Hebrides Overture
Ignaz Moscheles 
Piano Concerto No.5, Op.87
Grand septuor, Op.88
Ivan Padovec – Variations, Op.4 (based on a Schubert waltz)
Ferdinand Ries 
Grande ouverture et marche triomphale, Op.172
Piano Concerto No.9, Op.177
Clara Schumann – Caprices en forme de valses, Op. 2
Robert Schumann - Toccata in C, Op. 7
Bedřich Smetana –  Galop (Kvapík) in D major, JB 2:1 
Johann Strauss, Sr. 
Cotillons, Op. 50
Bajaderen-Walzer, Op. 53
Contratänze, Op. 54
Alexandra-Walzer, Op. 56
Sigismond Thalberg – 6 Deutsche Lieder, Op. 8
Richard Wagner 
Polonaise in D major, WWV 23
2 Entreactes tragiques, WWV 25
Concert Overture No.2 in C major, WWV 27 (dated March 3-17)
Symphony in C, WWV 29

Opera
Daniel François Esprit Auber – Le Serment, premiered October 1 in Paris
Gaetano Donizetti 
L'elisir d'amore, May 12, Teatro della Canobbiana, Milan.
Sancia di Castiglia (opera seria, first performed at the Teatro San Carlo in Naples, on November 4, 1832)
Fromental Halévy – La tentation
Albert Lortzing – Der Pole und sein Kind (premiered October 11 in Osnabrück

Popular music
 "The Bloom is on the Rye (My Pretty Jane)" by Edward Fitzball & Henry Rowley Bishop

Publications
Ludwig van Beethoven – Published posthumously: Studien im Generalbass, Contrapunkt und in der Compositionslehre
Joseph Funk – A Compilation of Genuine Church Music
Nicola Vaccai – Metodo pratico de canto

Births
January 1 – Aloys Kunc, pedagogue and composer (died 1895)
January 17 – Marie Wieck, pianist, singer, piano teacher, and composer (died 1916)
January 27 – Lewis Carroll, lyricist (died 1898)
January 28 – Franz Wüllner, conductor and composer (died 1902)
February 12 – Gustave Satter, pianist and composer (died 1879)
February 15 – Nicolás Ruiz Espadero, pianist, composer, piano teacher and editor of the works of Louis Moreau Gottschalk (died 1890)
March 1 – Friedrich Grützmacher, cellist (died 1903)
March 4 – Ivan Melnikov, operatic baritone (died 1906)
March 7 – William Busnach, librettist (died 1907)
April 14 – Wilhelm Busch, lyricist (died 1908)
April 15 – Gabriel Baille, composer (died 1909)
June 3 – Charles Lecocq, composer (died 1918)
July 2 – Félix Henri Duquesnel, lyricist (died 1915)
June 15 – Sigmund Schlesinger, composer (died 1918)
July 17 – August Söderman, composer (died 1876)
July 24 – Johann Lauterbach, composer (died 
August 3
Étienne Rey, composer (died 1923)
Ivan Zajc, composer, conductor, director and teacher (died 1914)
August 7 – Julius Epstein, pianist (died 1926)
August 15 – Ernst Naumann, organist and composer (died 1910)
September 9 – Petro Nishchynsky, composer (died 1896)
September 14 – Giuseppe Capponi, operatic tenor (died 1889)
September 20 – Johann Joseph Abert, composer (died 1915)
October 1 – Henry Clay Work, US composer (died 1884)
October 7 – Charles Crozat Converse, composer (died 1918)
October 14 – Heinrich Armin Rattermann, lyricist and translator (died 1923)
October 22
Leopold Damrosch, conductor (died 1885)
Robert Eitner, musicologist (died 1905)
August Labitzky, composer and kapellmeister (died 1903)
October 25 – Julián Arcas, composer (died 1882)
October 29 – Anders Heyerdahl, violinist and composer (died 1918)
November 1 – Eleanora Ehrenbergů, operatic soprano (died 1912)
November 11 – Paolo Giorza, composer (died 1914)
November 12 – John Troutbeck, musicologist (died 1899)
December 24 – Manuel Del Palacio, lyricist (died 1906)
date unknown – Julián Arcas, composer for guitar (died 1882)

Deaths
February 15 – Hartenack Otto Conrad Zinck, composer (born 1746)
March 10 – Muzio Clementi, composer and pianist, 80
March 12 – Friedrich Kuhlau, composer, 45 (born 1786)
March 22 – Johann Wolfgang von Goethe, lyricist and librettist (born 1749)
March 23 – Wilhelm Würfel, pianist, conductor and composer, 41
May 15 – Carl Friedrich Zelter, conductor, composer and music teacher, 73
May 26 – François-Louis Perne, composer and musicologist, 59
June 10 – Manuel García, opera singer, 57
July 25 – Sébastien Demar, composer (born 1763)
July 28 –  Joseph Schreyvogel, music publisher (born 1768)
August 19 – George Aspull, pianist, singer and composer, 19
August 31 –  Auguste Kreutzer, composer (born 1778)
September 9 – Bernhard Klein, composer, 39
September 21 – Sir Walter Scott, lyricist (born 1771)
November 3 – Pietro Generali, composer, 59
November 15 – Konrad von Schmidt-Phiseldeck, lyricist (born 1770)
December 12 – Andrea Nozzari, operatic tenor, 57
December 22 – Ishmail Spicer, composer, 72
December 31 – Adelaide Malanotte, operatic contralto, 47
date unknown 
Philip Antony Corri, composer (b. 1784)
Isabelle de Montolieu, lyricist and translator (born 1751)

References

 
19th century in music
Music by year